Chester Township is one of the sixteen townships of Geauga County, Ohio, United States. As of the 2020 census the population was 9,958.

Geography
Located in the northwestern corner of the county, it borders the following townships and municipalities:
Kirtland - north
Chardon Township - northeast corner
Munson Township - east
Newbury Township - southeast corner
Russell Township - south
Hunting Valley - southwest corner
Gates Mills - west
Willoughby Hills - northwest corner

No municipalities are located in Chester Township, although the census-designated place of Chesterland is located in the township's center.

Name and history
Chester Township was established in 1816.

It is one of five Chester Townships statewide. In the nineteenth century, it was home to the Geauga Seminary, a Free Will Baptist school, which President Garfield attended.

Government
The township is governed by a three-member board of trustees, who are elected in November of odd-numbered years to a four-year term beginning on the following January 1. Two are elected in the year after the presidential election and one is elected in the year before it. There is also an elected township fiscal officer, who serves a four-year term beginning on April 1 of the year after the election, which is held in November of the year before the presidential election. Vacancies in the fiscal officership or on the board of trustees are filled by the remaining trustees.

Notable people
Fordyce R. Melvin, Wisconsin State Assemblyman, farmer, and businessman, was born in the township.

References

External links
Township website
County website

Townships in Geauga County, Ohio
Populated places established in 1816
1816 establishments in Ohio
Townships in Ohio